Aïssata  is both a surname and a female given name. It is French spelling of a Fulani name ultimately derived from Arabic عَائِشَةُ (ʿāʾišatu, “Aisha”). Notable people with the name include:

Given name
Aïssata Coulibaly (born 1983), Malian football player
Aïssata Issoufou Mahamadou, Nigerian First Lady and scientist
Aïssata Kane (1938–2019), Mauritanian politician and women's rights activist
Aïssata Lam (born 1986/87), Mauritanian women's rights activist
Aïssata Soulama (born 1979), Burkinabé hurdler
Aissata Diallo (born 1994), Guinean-American reality star

Surname
Mounkaïla Aïssata, Nigerian politician